Scott Beach (born November 15, 1980), also known by the ring name Aden Chambers, is an American semi-retired professional wrestler. He is best known for his appearances with the East Coast Wrestling Association (ECWA) in the 2000s and Ring of Honor (ROH) in the early 2010s.

Professional wrestling career

ECWA (2004-2013)
In the East Coast Wrestling Association he teamed with Kekoa the Flyin Hawaiian to win the 2012 K-CUP, resulting in Aden being entered into their 2013 Hall of Fame as the only man to win every championship and tournament in the company, having won the ECWA Heavyweight, Mid-Atlantic, Tag Team, and 2008 ECWA Super 8 Tournament. He retired from the company after this.

Championships and accomplishments
East Coast Wrestling Association
ECWA Heavyweight Championship (1 time)
ECWA Mid-Atlantic Championship (1 time)
ECWA Tag Team Championship (2 times) – with Andrew Ryker and Kekoa the Flyin Hawaiian
ECWA Super 8 Tournament (2008)
ECWA K-Cup Tournament (2012)
ECWA Hall of Fame (Class of 2013)
Fusion Wrestling
Fusion Wrestling Tag Team Championship – with Brandon Day
Maryland Championship Wrestling
Shane Shamrock Memorial Cup finalist (2009, 2011)
NWA Anarchy
NWA Anarchy Young Lions Championship (1 time)
Pro Wrestling Illustrated
PWI ranked him # 332 of the 500 best singles wrestlers of the PWI 500 in 2007
PWI ranked him # 324 of the 500 best singles wrestlers of the PWI 500 in 2008
PWI ranked him # 270 of the 500 best singles wrestlers of the PWI 500 in 2009
PWI ranked him # 308 of the 500 best singles wrestlers of the PWI 500 in 2010
PWI ranked him # 316 of the 500 best singles wrestlers of the PWI 500 in 2011
PWI ranked him # 310 of the 500 best singles wrestlers of the PWI 500 in 2012

References

External links

Aden Chambers at Cagematch.net

Aden Chambers at Wrestlingdata.com
Professional wrestling record for Aden Chambers from The Internet Wrestling Database

1983 births
Living people
American male professional wrestlers